A beaver dam or beaver impoundment is a dam built by beavers to create a pond which protects against predators such as coyotes, wolves and bears, and holds their food during winter. These structures modify the natural environment in such a way that the overall ecosystem builds upon the change, making beavers a keystone species and ecosystem engineers. They build prolifically at night, carrying mud and stones with their forepaws and timber between their teeth.

Construction
In lakes, rivers and large streams with deep enough water, beavers may not even need to build dams, and instead simply live in bank burrows and lodges. If the water is not deep enough to keep beavers safe from predators and their lodge entrances ice-free, beavers build dams.

Beavers start construction by diverting the stream to lessen the water's flow pressure. Branches and logs are then driven into the mud of the stream bed to form a base. Then sticks, bark (from deciduous trees), rocks, mud, grass, leaves, masses of plants, and anything else available are used to build the superstructure. Beavers can transport their own weight in material; they drag logs along mudslides and float them through canals to get them in place. Once the dam has flooded enough area to the proper depth to form a protective moat for the lodge (often covering many acres), beavers begin construction on the lodge.

The length depends on the diameter of the tree and the size of the beaver. Logs of this size are not intended to be used as structural members of the dam; rather, the bark is used for food, and sometimes to get to upper branches. A beaver's jaws are powerful enough to cut a  sapling in one bite.

Maintenance work on the dam and lodges is often done in autumn.

Furthermore, if beavers are considered central place foragers, then their canals may be considered an extension of their "central place" far beyond the lodge, according to a 2004–2012 study that mapped beaver ponds and cut stumps.

It is claimed by some that by building dams, beavers are expressing tool use behaviour.

Size
The largest beaver dam known to exist is in Wood Buffalo National Park in Alberta, Canada and measures  in length. Satellite photos provided by NASA WorldWind show the dam did not exist in 1975 but it appeared in subsequent images. It has two or more lodges and is a combination of two original dams. Google Earth images show new dams being built which could ultimately join the main dam and increase the overall length by another  during the next decade. Coordinates: 58°16'15"N 112°15'6"W

Effects

Dam building can be helpful in restoring wetlands. Wetland benefits include flood control downstream, biodiversity (by providing habitat for different species), and water cleansing, both by the breakdown of toxins such as pesticides and the retention of silt by beaver dams. Beaver dams reduce erosion as well as decrease the turbidity that can be a limiting factor for some aquatic life. The benefits may be long-term and largely unnoticed unless a catchment is monitored closely. Almost half of endangered and threatened species in North America rely upon wetlands.

In 2012, a systematic review was conducted on the impacts of beaver dams on fishes and fish habitat (biased to North America (88%)). The most frequently cited benefits of beaver dams were increased habitat heterogeneity, rearing and overwintering habitat as well as flow refuge, and invertebrate production. Impeded fish movement because of dams, siltation of spawning habitat and low oxygen levels in ponds were the most often cited negative impacts. Benefits (184) were cited more frequently than costs (119).

Flood control
A beaver dam may have a freeboard above the water level. When heavy rains occur, the river or lake fills up. Afterwards the dam gradually releases the extra stored water, thus somewhat reducing the height of the flood wave moving down the river.

The surface of any stream intersects the surrounding water table. By raising the stream level, the gradient of the surface of the water table above the beaver dam is reduced, and water near the beaver dam flows more slowly into the stream. This may also help in reducing flood waves, and increasing water flow when there is no rain. In other words, beaver dams smooth out water flow by increasing the area wetted by the stream. This allows more water to seep into the ground where its flow is slowed. This water eventually finds its way back to the stream. Rivers with beaver dams in their head waters have lower high water and higher low water levels.

By raising the water table in wetlands such as peatlands, they can stabilize a fluctuating water table, which influences the levels of both carbon and water. In a 2017 study of beaver dam hydrology, monitored beaver dams in a Rocky Mountain peatland were found to increase groundwater storage and regional water balance, which can be beneficial for preventing drought. The study also suggested potential to improve carbon sequestration.

Excess nutrient removal

Beaver ponds can cause the removal of nutrients from the stream flow. Farming along the banks of rivers often increases the loads of phosphates, nitrates and other nutrients, which can cause eutrophication and may contaminate drinking water. Besides silt, the beaver dam collects twigs and branches from the beavers' activity as well as leaves, notably in the autumn. The main component of this material is cellulose, a polymer of β-glucose monomers. (This creates a more crystalline structure than is found in starch, which is composed of α-glucose monomers. Cellulose is a type of polysaccharide.) Many bacteria produce cellulase which can split off the glucose and use it for energy. Just as algae receive energy from sunlight, these bacteria derive energy from cellulose, and form the base of a very similar food chain. 

Additionally, bacterial populations absorb nitrogen and phosphorus compounds as they pass by in the water stream and keep these and other nutrients in the beaver pond and the surrounding ecology.

Pesticide and herbicide removal
Agriculture introduces herbicides and pesticides into streams. Some of these toxicants are metabolized and decomposed by the bacteria in the cellulose-rich bottom of a beaver dam.

Denitrification
Some scientists believe that the nitrogen cascade, the production of more fixed nitrogen than the natural cycles can turn back into nitrogen gas, may be as much of a problem to Earth's ecology as carbon dioxide production.  Studies have shown that beaver dams along a stream contribute to denitrification (the conversion of nitrogen compounds back into nitrogen). Bacteria in the dirt and the plant debris, which collects at the dams, turns nitrates into nitrogen gas. The gas bubbles to the surface and mixes with the atmosphere once more.

Salmon and trout

Beaver dams and the associated ponds can provide nurseries for salmon and trout. An early indication of this was seen following the 1818 agreement between the British government of Canada and the government of America allowing Americans access to the Columbia watershed. The Hudson's Bay Company, in a fit of pique, instructed its trappers to extirpate the fur-bearing animals in the area. The beaver was the first to be made locally extinct. Salmon runs fell precipitously in the following years, even though none of the factors associated with the decline of salmon runs were extant at that time.

There are several reasons why beaver dams increase salmon runs. They produce ponds that are deep enough for juvenile salmon to hide from predatory wading birds. They trap nutrients in their ecology and notably the nutrient pulse represented by the migration of the adult salmon upstream. These nutrients help feed the juveniles after the yolk sac has been digested. The dams provide calm water which means that the young salmon can use energy for growth rather than for navigating currents; larger smolts with a food reserve have a better rate of survival when they reach the sea. Finally, beaver dams keep the water clear which favours all salmonoids.

Frogs
Beaver dams have been shown to be beneficial to frog and toad populations, likely because they provide protected areas for larvae to mature in warmer, well-oxygenated water. A study in Alberta, Canada, showed that "Pitfall traps on beaver ponds captured 5.7 times more newly metamorphosed wood frogs, 29 times more western toads and 24 times more boreal chorus frogs than on nearby free-flowing streams."

Birds
Beaver dams help migrating songbirds. By stimulating the growth of species of plants that are critical to populations of songbirds in decline, beaver dams help create food and habitat. The presence of beaver dams has been shown to be associated with an increased diversity of songbirds. They can also have positive effects on local waterfowl, such as ducks, that are in need of standing water habitats.

Disruption

Beaver dams can be disruptive; the flooding can cause extensive property damage, and, when the flooding occurs next to a railroad roadbed, it can cause derailments by washing out the tracks. When a beaver dam bursts, the resulting flash flood may overwhelm a culvert.

Traditional solutions to beaver problems have been focused on the trapping and removal of all the beavers in the area. While this is sometimes necessary, it is typically a short-lived solution, as beaver populations have made a remarkable comeback in the United States (after near extirpation in the nineteenth century) and are likely to continually recolonize suitable habitat. Modern solutions include relatively cost-effective and low maintenance flow devices.

Introduced to an area without its natural predators, as in Tierra del Fuego, beavers have flooded thousands of acres of land and are considered a plague. One notable difference in Tierra del Fuego from most of North America is that the trees in Tierra del Fuego cannot be coppiced as can willows, poplars, aspens, and other North American trees. Thus the damage by the beavers seems more severe. The beaver's disruption is not limited to human geography; beavers can destroy nesting habitat for endangered species.

Warming temperatures in the Arctic allow beavers to extend their habitat further north, where their dams impair boat travel, impact access to food, affect water quality, and endanger downstream fish populations. Pools formed by the dams store heat, thus changing local hydrology and causing localized thawing of permafrost that in turn contributes to global warming.

Stream life cycle

Wetland creation
If a beaver pond becomes too shallow due to sediment accumulation, or the tree supply is depleted, beavers will abandon the site. Eventually the dam will be breached and the water will drain out. The rich thick layer of silt, branches, and dead leaves behind the old dam is an ideal habitat for some wetland species.

Meadow creation
As the wetland fills up with plant debris and dries out, pasture species colonize it and the wetland may eventually become a meadow suitable for grazing in a previously forested area. This provides a valuable niche for many animals which otherwise would be excluded. Beaver dam creation also increases the plants the dams were made from (such as willows) to reproduce by cutting, encouraging the growth of adventitious roots.

Riverine forest
Finally the meadow will be colonized by riverine trees, typically aspens, willows and such species which are favoured by the beaver. Beavers are then likely to recolonize the area, and the cycle begins again.

Bottomland
Each time the stream life cycle repeats itself another layer of organic soil is added to the bottom of the valley. The valley slowly fills and the flat area at the bottom widens. Research is sparse, but it seems likely that parts of the bottomland in North America was created, or at least added to, by the efforts of the generations of beavers that lived there.

Beaver dam analogue

Humans sometimes build structures similar to beaver dams in streams, either to get the benefits of beaver dams in places without beavers, or to encourage beavers to settle in a particular area. These are often called "beaver dam analogs" (BDA) although other names are also used. When the goal is to attract beavers, sometimes the site is unsuitable in its present condition, such as being too eroded for beavers to build a dam in their usual way. BDA builders may use construction techniques beyond the beaver's capabilities, such as driving wooden posts into the stream bed to brace horizontal branches that would otherwise be washed away. The hope is that beavers who wander by or are brought in will choose to live there and take over construction and maintenance of the dam.

See also
 Environmental impacts of beavers
 Logjam, an accumulation of wood debris on a river or stream

References

External links

 "Worth a Dam" (beaver information and educational site)
 
 Video of a beaver building a dam

Beavers
Ponds
Dams by type